Aleksei Borisovich Shulgin (born 2 June 1997) is a Russian football player. He plays for FC Kuban-Holding Pavlovskaya.

Club career
He made his debut in the Russian Football National League for FC Kuban Krasnodar on 10 July 2021 in a game against FC Torpedo Moscow.

References

External links
 
 Profile by Russian Football National League

1997 births
Sportspeople from Krasnodar
Living people
Russian footballers
Association football forwards
FC Kuban Krasnodar players
FC Urozhay Krasnodar players
Russian Second League players
Russian First League players